Platanthera bhutanica is a species of orchid native to South-central China, East Himalaya and Tibet.

References

bhutanica